"S" Is for Silence is the 19th novel in Sue Grafton's "Alphabet" series of mystery novels and features Kinsey Millhone, a private eye based in Santa Teresa, California. 

In a departure from the series format, this novel is set in alternating chapters both in the "past" of 1953 and the "present" of 1987.

Shortly after publication, this novel topped The New York Times best-seller list for hardcover fiction.

Plot summary
In 1953, Violet Sullivan vanishes after going out for a Fourth of July party in the small town of Serena Station, California. Her exact whereabouts are unknown, however there are many tales that she fled off with a lover or was killed by her envious husband. 34 years later, Kinsey Millhone is hired by Daisy, Violet's daughter, to assist discover answers and closure regarding Violet's disappearance. After interviewing close acquaintances, as suggested by Daisy, Kinsey's biggest clue comes from Winston, who worked at the dealership where Violet bought her Bel Air, which also disappeared. Winston admits to originally hiding the fact that he saw the Bel Air abandoned on an offbeat road. While visiting with Daisy's friend Tannie, whose property overlooks the road, Kinsey spots an oblong depression in the soil and correctly theorizes that the car, along with Violet, is buried beneath. The curtain Violet is wrapped in initially implicates her husband Foley, as he ripped them off the window during a fight the couple had the previous day. However, Kinsey is able to confirm that he could not have spent the 24 hours digging the hole as he was in prison for public drunkenness the previous night and assisted the local sergeant with a woodworking project upon being released the next day. On a final hunch, Kinsey tracks down the breeder of Violet's dog and finds the name of the killer, Tom Padgett, who gave her the dog to try to subdue her for a loan to start up his heavy equipment business.  

The plot differs from other novels in the "Alphabet Mystery" series in that it switches perspective between Violet and Kinsey, and switches the period between 1953 and 1987. Grafton would again use this narrative device in the next instalment, "T" is for Trespass.

Characters
Kinsey Millhone: Private detective hired by the family of Violet Sullivan to seek closure.
Violet Sullivan: She disappears in 1953, leaving behind a daughter, Daisy. The story regularly switches between her and Kinsey's point of view.

Reviews
In December 2005, this novel topped The New York Times best-seller list for hardcover fiction. By December 2006, there were 1.2 million copies in print.

Spoofs
The Great News episode "Carol Has A Bully" features a spoof version of this novel, renaming it S Is For Sex Murder.

References

External links
Sue Grafton Alphabet Series official site

Novels by Sue Grafton
Kinsey Millhone novels
2005 American novels
Fiction set in 1953
Fiction set in 1987
Novels set in California
G. P. Putnam's Sons books